Filatima isocrossa is a moth of the family Gelechiidae. It is found in North America, where it has been recorded from Texas.

The wingspan is 15–18 mm. The forewings are cinereous, the scales tipped with dark grey and with scattered white scales along the costa. There is an ill-defined white fascia at the apical fourth extending to the tornus. There is a conspicuous black dash in the cell, from the middle of the wing to the end of the cell, turning at the end of the cell and extending broadly, but less distinctly to the tornus just inside the termination of the white fascia. From the outer end of the black dash an elongate patch of light sayal brown extends across the white transverse fascia. There are narrow, indistinct streaks of sayal brown along the costa and in the fold and the apex of the wing is purplish fuscous. The hindwings are grey, basally shading to dark fuscous apically.

The larvae feed on Acacia vernicosa.

References

Moths described in 1927
Filatima